Charles Kamara Gyamfi (born 7 September 1999) is a Ghanaian professional footballer who plays as a forward for Ghanaian Premier League side Aduana Stars.

Career

Bibiani GoldStars 
Gyamfi started his career with Bibiani GoldStars playing for them in the Zone 2 of the Ghana Division One League, before joining Aduana Stars in 2019. He was one of the top performers in the  League for GoldStars during the 2017–18 season.

Aduana Stars 
Gyamfi was linked to Aduana Stars in early part of 2019. He joined the Dormaa-based side February 2019. towards the start of the 2019–20 Ghana Premier League season. He made his debut on 5 February 2020, after coming on at half time for Noah Martey in a 3–1 loss to Cape Coast Ebusua Dwarfs. He went on a made 6 league appearances before it was cancelled as a result of the COVID-19 pandemic in June 2020. In November 2020, he made the cut for the 2020–21 season squad list as the league was set to restart in November 2020.

References

External links 

 
 

Living people
1999 births
Association football forwards
Ghanaian footballers
Aduana Stars F.C. players
Ghana Premier League players